Hollenhorst is a surname. Notable people with the surname include:

Robert Hollenhorst (1913–2008), American ophthalmologist
Hollenhorst plaque
Steve Hollenhorst (born 1959), American environmental scientist